Manega is a town in the Kokologho Department of Boulkiemdé Province in central western Burkina Faso. It has a population of 1,991.

References

Populated places in Boulkiemdé Province